Bay Springs is a city in and the western county seat of Jasper County, Mississippi, United States. The population was 1,786 at the 2010 census, down from 2,097 at the 2000 census. State highways 15 and 18 intersect at the city. It is part of the Laurel, Mississippi (in Jones County) micropolitan area.

The area was settled in the 1880s by Joe Blankenship, who built the sawmill for the yellow pine timber industry that comprised the town's industrial base. The city was incorporated about twenty years later after railroads were constructed through it. That access attracted other industry and business, and the city was designated as the second county seat. Its population has declined slightly since 2000.

Geography
Bay Springs is located in western Jasper County at  (31.976761, -89.279574). Mississippi Highway 15 (Court Street) passes through the center of town, leading north  to Newton and south  to Laurel. Highway 18 (Fifth Avenue) crosses Highway 15 in the center of town and leads northeast  to Rose Hill and west  to Raleigh.

Demographics

2020 census

As of the 2020 United States census, there were 1,670 people, 641 households, and 392 families residing in the city.

2000 census
As of the census of 2000, there were 2,097 people, 793 households, and 524 families residing in the city. The population density was 142.0/km2 (54.8/mi2). There were 880 housing units at an average density of 59.6 km2 (23.0/mi2). The racial makeup of the city was 50.02% White, 49.64% African American, 0.05% from other races, and 0.29% from two or more races. Hispanic or Latino of any race were 0.57% of the population.

There were 793 households, out of which 30.5% had children under the age of 18 living with them, 42.9% were married couples living together, 20.3% had a female householder with no husband present, and 33.8% were non-families. 32.5% of all households were made up of individuals, and 17.9% had someone living alone who was 65 years of age or older. The average household size was 2.45 and the average family size was 3.13.

In the city, the population was spread out, with 24.7% under the age of 18, 8.9% from 18 to 24, 23.1% from 25 to 44, 22.9% from 45 to 64, and 20.4% who were 65 years of age or older. The median age was 40 years. For every 100 females, there were 77.3 males. For every 100 females age 18 and over, there were 75.1 males.

The median income for a household in the city was $22,895, and the median income for a family was $30,938. Males had a median income of $31,806 versus $19,091 for females. The per capita income for the city was $14,199. About 26.0% of families and 28.8% of the population were below the poverty line, including 36.5% of those under age 18 and 33.1% of those age 65 or over.

Economics

Bay Springs was the site of one of six Sunbeam plants in Mississippi. When Albert J. Dunlap downsized the company and closed the plant, 300 people lost their jobs. The last workers left the plant at the same time that Dunlap was negotiating a new contract for himself, worth over $46 million. The average annual salary at the Bay Springs plant had been less than $25,000.

More recently, the Hol-Mac Corporation has located light industrial/manufacturing facilities in and around the Bay Springs area. One of the county's largest employers, this developing corporation has partnered with nearby Jones County Junior College with regard to job training and continues to expand employment opportunities in the local community. Hol-Mac operates facilities in the town of Bay Springs and north of town in designated industrial areas between Bay Springs and the town of Louin. As of 2015, it has three main manufacturing facilities in the area, as well as additional office/HR support facilities.

Georgia-Pacific Corporation has long had facilities to handle lumber and timber processing in the Bay Springs area.

The city has a county courthouse, as it is the second county seat in Jasper County. Originally there were limited roads from east to west across the county, and the two seats served local people.

Education
Bay Springs is served by the West Jasper School District. Its comprehensive high school is Bay Springs High School.

The city also has a private school, Sylva-Bay Academy.

Notable people
Jesse L. Brown, first African-American aviator in the U.S., attended Bay Springs High School in 1940
Snoop Conner, National Football League player
 Carolyn Jones-Young, former professional basketball player
 Haskins Montgomery, member of the Mississippi Senate
 Cody Prewitt, former National Football League player
 Johnny Stringer, former member of the Mississippi House of Representatives
 Johnny Thomas, head football coach of Alcorn State University from 1998 to 2007
 Freddye Harper Williams. journalist and Oklahoma state legislator

Climate
The climate in this area is characterized by hot, humid summers and generally mild to cool winters.  According to the Köppen Climate Classification system, Bay Springs has a humid subtropical climate, abbreviated "Cfa" on climate maps.

References

External links
City of Bay Springs official website

Cities in Mississippi
Cities in Jasper County, Mississippi
County seats in Mississippi
Cities in Laurel micropolitan area